Darius Bradwell (born May 15, 1997) is an American football running back for the Seattle Sea Dragons of the XFL. He played college football at Tulane.

College career
Bradwell was a member of the Tulane Green Wave for four seasons. He finished his collegiate career with 2,062 yards and 17 touchdowns on 289 carries.

Professional career

Los Angeles Chargers
Bradwell was signed by the Los Angeles Chargers as an undrafted free agent on April 27, 2020. He was waived during final roster cuts on September 5, 2020, and signed to the practice squad the next day. He was elevated to the active roster on September 19 for the team's week 2 game against the Kansas City Chiefs, and reverted to the practice squad after the game. He was elevated again on September 26 for the week 3 game against the Carolina Panthers, and reverted to the practice squad after the game. He signed a reserve/future contract with the Chargers on January 5, 2021.

On August 31, 2021, Bradwell was waived by the Chargers and re-signed to the practice squad the next day.

Carolina Panthers
On January 15, 2022, Bradwell signed a reserve/future contract with the Carolina Panthers. He was waived on August 14, 2022.

St Louis BattleHawks 
On January 1, 2023, Bradwell was selected by the St. Louis BattleHawks in the 12th round of the 2023 XFL Supplemental Draft.

Seattle Sea Dragons
Bradwell was placed on the reserve list by the Seattle Sea Dragons on March 6, 2023.

References

External links
Tulane Green Wave bio
Los Angeles Chargers bio

1997 births
Living people
Players of American football from Tallahassee, Florida
American football running backs
Tulane Green Wave football players
Los Angeles Chargers players
Carolina Panthers players
St. Louis BattleHawks players
Seattle Sea Dragons players